For Those in Love is a studio album by American jazz vocalist Dinah Washington with musical arrangements by Quincy Jones. It was originally released by EmArcy Records in June 1955, and was reissued by EmArcy Records in 1991.

In popular culture
Washington's version of "I Could Write a Book", which appears as the seventh track of For Those in Love, was used in the ninth episode of the first season of the American television series Ash vs Evil Dead.

Track listing
 "I Get a Kick Out of You" (Cole Porter) – 6:17
 "Blue Gardenia" (Lester Lee, Bob Russell) – 5:18
 "Easy Living" (Ralph Rainger, Leo Robin) – 5:00
 "You Don't Know What Love Is" (Don Raye, Gene de Paul) – 4:02
 "This Can't Be Love" (Rodgers and Hart) – 6:50
 "My Old Flame" (Sam Coslow, Arthur Johnston) – 3:05
 "I Could Write a Book" (Rodgers and Hart) – 4:23
 "Make the Man Love Me" (Dorothy Fields, Arthur Schwartz) – 5:23

Additional tracks on 1992 CD reissue

Personnel
 Dinah Washington – lead vocals
 Clark Terry –  trumpet
 Paul Quinichette – tenor saxophone
 Cecil Payne – baritone saxophone
 Jimmy Cleveland – trombone
 Wynton Kelly – piano
 Barry Galbraith – guitar
 Keter Betts – bass
 Jimmy Cobb – drums

References

1955 albums
Dinah Washington albums
EmArcy Records albums
Verve Records albums